In telecommunication, a personal communications service is defined by the Alliance for Telecommunications Industry Solutions (ATIS) as "a set of capabilities that allows some combination of personal mobility, terminal mobility, and service profile management".

Personal communications services use a special non-geographic area code of the format 5XX for assigning telephone numbers for service instances.

The designation of the 5XX area code format was authorized by the United States Federal Communications Commission, and introduced into the North American Numbering Plan in 1995.

United States
In 1995, AT&T introduced a "follow-me" service under the brand name of AT&T True Connections using area code 500. It was designed to replace the AT&T EasyReach 700 service. Other local exchange carriers and interexchange carriers introduced similar competitive services.  AT&T True Connections service was not well received. Companies, hotels, and others with PBX equipment continued to block the dialing of 500 because it was a caller-paid number. Phone-sex services also used the 500-prefix, forwarding the calls to various foreign countries.

The area code was once also used for dial-up modem access.

In 1996, AT&T attempted to migrate users to its revised service called "Personal Reach" 800, built on a toll-free (receiver-paid) platform rather than the original (caller-paid) 500 program.  AT&T has a US patent (5,907,811) on "personal reach service".

AT&T then licensed and transferred all personal reach services to MCE, Inc. MCE was supposedly the company providing the back-end system for all personal reach services to AT&T. No public information was released on the transfer away from AT&T. Subscribers were notified by mail that bills would begin to arrive from MCE instead of AT&T. It is also believed that MCE is a subsidiary of EMNS, Inc., a web hosting company in Chicago. MCE continues to supply personal reach service using the AT&T transport network.

AT&T discontinued AT&T True Connections in 2000, following the Federal Communications Commission approval of its tariff to cease providing the service.

The numbering resources are now designated 5XX-NXX in NANP and are used for machine to machine communication.

Although AT&T no longer uses the 500 code, it was supplemented by 533 in 2009, followed by 544 in December 2010. The 566 code was activated in April 2012. In March 2014, the 577 code was also activated. In September 2015 the 588 code was activated. In August 2016 the 522 code was activated. In September 2017 the 521 code was activated. In November 2018 the 523 code was activated. In September 2019 the 524 code was activated. In July 2020 the 525 code was activated. In January 2021 the 526 code was activated. Other codes in reserve for this use: 527, 528, 529, 532, 535, 538, 542, 543, 545, 546, 547, 549, 550, 552, 553, 554, 556, 558, 569, 578, and 589.

On February 11, 2022, 103 of the 5XX-NXX codes were reported as available for assignment and the code 528 was designated as the next NPA code to be assigned. On March 2, 2022, the NANPA announced the initiation of NPA 528.

On August 29, 2022, 193 of the 5XX-NXX codes were reported as available for assignment and the code 529 was designated as the next NPA code to be assigned. On September 16, 2022, the NANPA announced the initiation of NPA 529.

Canada
In 2015, the Canadian Radio-television and Telecommunications Commission (CRTC) approved the Canadian Non-Geographic Code Assignment Guideline and the assignment of the 622, 633, 644, 655, 677, and 688 non-geographic numbering plan area (NPA) codes to meet the demand for telephone numbers related to technologies such as machine-to-machine applications. The first 6YY NPA to be used is 622 NPA, with additional numbers requested when 622 approaches exhaustion.

See also
 List of North American Numbering Plan area codes
 Toll-free telephone numbers in the North American Numbering Plan
 Area code 700
 Area code 900

References

External links
 
 FCC Order Permitting AT&T to discontinue 500 number service
 NANPA Numbering Resources - PCS 5YY-NXX Assignments

Mobile telecommunications
500